South Korean boy group Monsta X had released nine studio albums, one reissue, twelve extended plays, and forty-seven singles. They also participated in singing three soundtracks for various K-dramas, three soundtracks for web based reality shows, one soundtrack for an animated film, and one soundtrack for a mobile game.

Produced and managed by Starship Entertainment, they debuted on May 14, 2015 with their extended play Trespass, which peaked at no. 5 on the Gaon Album Chart. The title track "Trespass" peaked at no. 148 on the Gaon Digital Chart.

Monsta X's second extended play Rush was released in September 2015, which contained the group's second lead single of the same name "Rush" and the follow-up single "Hero".

In 2016, the group released two parts of their The Clan series. Their third extended play The Clan Pt. 1 Lost was released in May 2016 and their fourth extended play The Clan Pt. 2 Guilty was released in October 2016.

In March 2017, The Clan Pt. 2.5: The Final Chapter, the group's first studio album and the final part of The Clan series was released. The lead single "Beautiful" peaked at no. 4 on the weekly Billboard World Digital Song Sales chart. The album was later re-released as Shine Forever and peaked at no. 1 on the weekly Gaon Album Chart. They released their fifth extended play The Code which included the lead single "Dramarama" in November 2017. The EP peaked at no. 1 on the weekly Gaon Album Chart and resulted in the group's first music show win for "Dramarama".

The group's second studio album was released in two parts: Take.1 Are You There? in 2018 and Take.2 We Are Here in 2019. In 2018, the group released their first Japanese-language album Piece, their second Japanese-language album Phenomenon in 2019, and their third Japanese-language album Flavors of Love in 2021.

In February 2020, the group released their first all-English album All About Luv, which debuted at no. 5 and no. 7 on the weekly US Billboard 200 and US Rolling Stone Top 200, respectively. The group released their second all-English album The Dreaming in December 2021.

Monsta X has singles in multiple languages other than Korean, just like their first Japanese-language single "Hero" that peaked at no. 2 on the weekly Oricon Singles Chart, and various 2019 collaborations, including Steve Aoki, for the English-language song "Play It Cool", and Sebastián Yatra, for the Spanish and English-language song "Magnetic".

Albums

Studio albums

Reissue

Extended plays

Singles

As lead artist

Collaborative singles

Promotional singles

Other charted songs

Soundtrack appearances

Videography

Video albums

Music videos

Notes

References

Discographies of South Korean artists
Discography
K-pop music group discographies
Hip hop group discographies